Gordon Stanley may refer to:

 Gordon Stanley (actor) (born 1951), American stage actor
 Gordon J. Stanley (1921–2001),  New Zealand-born radio astronomer
 Gordon Arthur Stanley (1921–1956), United States Navy aviator